Francis Lockier, BD was the first dean of Peterborough.

Leycester graduated from the University of Cambridge in 1521. A Cluniac monk he was the last prior of St Andrew's Priory, Northampton.

References

Deans of Peterborough
16th-century Christian monks
Alumni of the University of Cambridge